Russell Williams II (born October 14, 1952) is an American production sound mixer. He has won two Academy Awards for Best Sound. He has worked on more than 50 films since 1976. He is a full-time professor and Distinguished Artist in Residence at the American University School of Communication in Washington, DC.

Selected filmography
 Training Day (2001)
 Dances with Wolves (1990)
 Glory (1989)
 Field of Dreams (1989)

Awards
 Academy Awards: 1989 (Glory) and 1990 (Dances With Wolves)
 Prime Time Emmys: 1988 (Terrorist on Trial: The United States vs. Salim Ajami) and 1998 (12 Angry Men)

References

External links

1952 births
Living people
Production sound mixers
Best Sound Mixing Academy Award winners
Emmy Award winners
American University faculty and staff